Simon Oliver Sinek (born October 9, 1973) is a British-born American author and inspirational speaker. He is the author of five books, including Start With Why (2009) and The Infinite Game (2019).

Early life and education
Sinek was born in Wimbledon, United Kingdom. Sinek's mother, Susan, is Jewish and of Hungarian Jewish descent.As a child, he lived in Johannesburg, London, and Hong Kong before his family settled in the United States. He graduated from Northern Valley Regional High School at Demarest in 1991. He received a BA in cultural anthropology from Brandeis University. He studied law at London's City University, but left law school to go into advertising.

Career

Sinek began his career at the New York ad agencies Euro RSCG and Ogilvy & Mather. He later launched his own business, Sinek Partners.

Sinek has written five books. Start With Why, his first book, was published October 2009. His second book, titled Leaders Eat Last, appeared on the bestseller lists of the Wall Street Journal and The New York Times.

As a motivational speaker, Sinek has spoken at the UN Global Compact Leaders Summit in 2016, and at TEDx conferences several times, beginning in 2009.

In June 2018, The Young Turks reported a $98,000 no-bid contract from U.S. Immigration and Customs Enforcement (ICE) for "customized Simon Sinek leadership training" to take place between April 26 and May 15, 2018, provided by Ernst & Young.

In November 2018, Publishers Weekly reported that Sinek would start Optimism Press, a new imprint of Penguin Random House.

Sinek was an instructor of strategic communications at Columbia University, and is an adjunct staff member of the RAND Corporation.

Books

References

American motivational writers
Living people
Brandeis University alumni
American non-fiction writers
American motivational speakers
American advertising executives
Northern Valley Regional High School at Demarest alumni
People from Bergen County, New Jersey
RAND Corporation people
British emigrants to the United States
1973 births